Tana is an Albanian feature film, produced by the "New Albania" Film Studio. The movie premiered on 17 August 1958. The film was directed by Kristaq Dhamo, and written by Kristaq Dhamo, Fatmir Gjata, and Nasho Jorgaqi. The music was also composed by Çesk Zadeja. The film was entered into the 1st Moscow International Film Festival. The film is often cited as the first feature length film produced fully in Albania.

Plot
The film is based on Fatmir Gjata's screenplay. Gjata had written a novel with the same title earlier. The events evolve in the 1950s. The main character, Tana, is a smart, outgoing and progressive young woman. She is in love with Stefan (Naim Frashëri) and they both live in an unnamed mountain village in Albania. Tana has to face the old mentality of her old grandfather, and she also has to fight the jealousy of Lefter (Kadri Roshi). It is a love game, while socialist progress is highlighted, as is often the case in socialist realism.

Cast
Tinka Kurti as Tana
Naim Frashëri as Stefani
Pjetër Gjoka as the Grandfather
Kadri Roshi as Lefter Dhosi
Andon Pano as the Cooperative Chief
Thimi Filipi as Party's secretary
Marie Logoreci as Stefan's Mother
Violeta Manushi		
Nikolla Panajoti		
Melpomeni Çobani	
Mihal Stefa		
Vani Trako		
Lazër Filipi		
Pandi Raidhi	
Lazër Vlashi
Esma Agolli

References

External links

Tana në Albanian Film Database

1958 films
Albanian drama films
Albanian-language films
Films directed by Kristaq Dhamo